Koffi Olympio (born 18 April 1975) is a Togolese former professional footballer who played as a defender. He played in eight matches for the Togo national team from 2000 to 2002. He was also named in Togo's squad for the 2002 African Cup of Nations tournament.

References

External links
 
 
 

1975 births
Living people
Sportspeople from Lomé
Togolese footballers
Association football defenders
Togo international footballers
2002 African Cup of Nations players
Ligue 2 players
Championnat National 2 players
Championnat National 3 players
AS Beauvais Oise players
ES La Rochelle players
AS Moulins players
Togolese expatriate footballers
Togolese expatriate sportspeople in France
Expatriate footballers in France
21st-century Togolese people